The Spanish Missions in Texas comprise a series of religious outposts established by Spanish Catholic Dominicans, Jesuits, and Franciscans to spread the Catholic doctrine among area Native Americans, but with 
the added benefit of giving Spain a toehold in the frontier land. The missions introduced European livestock, fruits, vegetables, and industry into the Texas area. In addition to the presidio (fortified church) and pueblo (town), the misión was one of the three major agencies employed by the Spanish crown to extend its borders and consolidate its colonial territories. In all, twenty-six missions were maintained for different lengths of time within the future boundaries of the state of Texas.

Since 1493, Spain had maintained missions throughout New Spain (Mexico and portions of what today are the southwestern United States) to facilitate colonization. The eastern Tejas missions were a direct response to fear of French encroachment when the remains of La Salle's Fort Saint Louis were discovered near Matagorda Bay in 1689, and a response to the first permanent French outposts along the Gulf Coast ten years later.

Following government policy, Franciscan missionaries sought to make life within mission communities closely resemble that of Spanish villages and Spanish culture. To become Spanish citizens and "productive" inhabitants, Native Americans learned vocational skills, such as plows, farm implements, and gear for horses, oxen, and mules fell into disrepair, blacksmithing skills soon became indispensable. Weaving skills were needed to help clothe the inhabitants. As buildings became more elaborate, mission occupants learned masonry and carpentry under the direction of craftsmen contracted by the missionaries.

In the closely supervised setting of the mission the Native Americans were expected to mature in Christianity and Spanish political and economic practices until they would no longer require special mission status. Then their communities could be incorporated as such into ordinary colonial society.  This transition from official mission status to ordinary Spanish society, when it occurred in an official manner, was called "secularization." In this official transaction, the mission's communal properties were privatized, the direction of civil life became a purely secular affair, and the direction of church life was transferred from the missionary religious orders to the Catholic diocesan church. Although colonial law specified no precise time for this transition to take effect, increasing pressure for the secularization of most missions developed in the last decades of the 18th century.

This mission system was developed in response to the often very detrimental results of leaving the Hispanic control of relations with Native Americans on the expanding frontier to overly enterprising civilians and soldiers. This had resulted too often in the abuse and even enslavement of the Indians and a heightening of antagonism.

In the end, the mission system was not politically strong enough to protect the Native Americans against the growing power of ranchers and other business interests that sought control over mission lands and the manpower represented by the Native Americans.  In the first few years of the new Republic of Mexico—between 1824 and 1830—all the missions still operating in Texas were officially secularized, with the sole exception of those in the El Paso district, which were turned over to diocesan pastors only in 1852.

Within boundaries of Spanish Texas
Spanish Texas was a part of New Spain. On its southern edge, Texas was bordered by the province of Coahuila. On the east, Texas bordered French Louisiana. Although Spain claimed that the Red River formed the boundary between the two, France insisted that the border was the Sabine River,  to the west.

Mission San Francisco de la Espada

The first mission established within the boundaries of Spanish Texas was San Francisco de la Espada.  In 1689, Spanish authorities found the remnants of a French settlement, Fort Saint Louis.  

During their expedition, the Spanish met representatives of the Caddo people, who lived between the Trinity and the Red Rivers.  The Caddo expressed interest in learning about Christianity, and the following year Alonso De León led an expedition to establish a mission in East Texas.  It was completed near the Hasinai village of Nabedaches in late May, and its first mass was conducted on June 1, 1690.

In its first two years of existence, the mission faced much hardship, as floodwaters and then drought destroyed their crops.  After an epidemic killed half of the local population, the Hasinai became convinced that the missionaries had caused the deaths.  Fearing an attack, on October 25, 1693 the missionaries buried the mission bell, set the building ablaze, and retreated to Mexico.

The mission was reestablished on July 3, 1716, as Nuestro Padre San Francisco de los Tejas. In 1721, it was renamed Mission San Francisco de los Neches.  It was moved in 1731 to San Antonio where it was named Mission San Francisco de la Espada.  The surviving structure is now part of San Antonio Missions National Historical Park operated by the National Park Service. A commemorative representation of Mission San Francisco de los Tejas, is located in Weches at Mission Tejas State Park.

Mission Santísimo Nombre de María
Mission Santísimo Nombre de María was the second mission established by the Spanish in East Texas. The mission consisted of a straw chapel and a house for the priest. It was destroyed by a flood in 1692.

Mission San Juan Capistrano

Mission San Juan Capistrano had been known as Mission San José de los Nazonis in East Texas. When the mission was relocated to San Antonio in 1731, it was renamed so as not to cause confusion with Mission San José y San Miguel de Aguayo. It was the most distant of the missions from the presidio at Bexar and was often raided by Apaches.

By 1762, the mission consisted of a stone chapel with stone rooms for the priests and the soldiers who lived at the mission.  Rooms made of adobe were built along the walls to house the 200 resident Native American peoples.  The mission was secularized in 1794, with the property divided among the remaining mission Indians.  A priest continued to hold church services there, but other mission activities ended.  The church has been restored and is still an active parish.

Mission Nuestra Señora de la Purísima Concepción de Acuña

This mission was originally established on the Angelina River in East Texas in 1716 as Mission Nuestra Señora de la Purísima Concepción de los Ainais. It served the Ainais tribe.  It was closed because of the French threat and reopened in 1721.  In 1730, it moved temporarily to present-day Austin before moving to San Antonio in 1731, where it was renamed Mission Nuestra Señora de la Purísima Concepción de Acuña.  The name was changed because the mission no longer served the Ainais tribe, and its new name honored the current viceroy of Mexico.

Most of the Native Americans at the mission were Coahuiltecans who disliked the hard work of mission life. The Native Americans often ran away and were brought back forcibly by soldiers or priests.

The current church building was completed in 1755 and is the oldest unrestored stone church in the United States. The mission was closed in 1794, with the property divided among the resident Native Americans, all of whom has left by 1800. For a time, the buildings were used as a cattle barn, but in 1855 the land and church were given to the Brothers of Mary, who cleaned it and began conducting services again. It is now open to the public for prayer, and is part of the National Park Service.

Mission San José de los Nazonis

Mission San José de los Nazonis was the third mission established in East Texas in 1716.  Located near a Nazoni village, the mission was established by the Domingo Ramón-St. Denis expedition and was near the present-day site of Cushing, Texas.  Although the mission closed after the French took the presidio at Los Adaes, it was reopened several years later by the Marquis de San Miguel de Aguayo.  In 1730, it was moved temporarily to what is now Austin, Texas near Barton Springs only for a few months before being permanently relocated to San Antonio, where it became known as San Juan Capistrano.

Mission Nuestra Señora de Guadalupe
Mission Nuestra Señora de Guadalupe was established in 1756 in central Texas near present-day New Braunfels, Texas to serve the local Waco and Tonkawa tribes congregating near the headwaters of the Comal river. It was closed in 1758 because of Comanche depredations and was never protected by a complementing presidio garrison.

Mission Nuestra Señora de Guadalupe de los Nacogdoches
Mission Nuestra Señora de Guadalupe de los Nacogdoches was established in 1716 by the Domingo Ramón-St. Denis expedition. Located in East Texas, the mission  was established to serve the Nacogdoche tribe.  It closed several years later because of threats from French Louisiana but reopened in 1721.  The mission continued until 1773, when the Spanish government ordered all of East Texas to be abandoned.  In 1779, Antonio Gil Y'Barbo led a group of settlers who had been removed from Los Adaes to the area to settle in the empty mission buildings.  This began the town of Nacogdoches, Texas.

Mission Nuestra Señora de los Dolores de los Ais
Mission Nuestra Señora de los Dolores de los Ais was originally established in 1717 in the area of Ayish Bayou (modern San Augustine, Texas) by Father Antonio Margil de Jesus. The mission was built to convert the local Ais Native Americans. Following the Chicken War in 1719, Spanish officials closed the East Texas missions and Father Margil and others were relocated to San Antonio. During the next year, Father Margil founded Mission San José (Texas). Mission Dolores was reestablished in 1721. Missionaries continued their work until 1773 when the East Texas missions were once again closed. 

Archeologists confirmed the location of the mission in the late 1970s. It is one of three archeologically confirmed mission locations in East Texas and the only site open to the public. The City of San Augustine constructed a museum, campground and archeology lab in 2000. Since July 1, 2016 the Texas Historical Commission has operated the site as Mission Dolores State Historic Site.

Mission San Miguel de Linares de los Adaes

Mission San Miguel de Linares de los Adaes was the fifth mission established in East Texas in 1716–1717. At that time, the Spanish claimed the Red River as the eastern boundary of Texas, so the mission was considered part of Spanish Texas, despite being in what is now considered Louisiana.

The mission was attacked by French soldiers in 1719 and was closed.  Three years later, the Marquis de San Miguel de Aguayo reopened the mission, but at a site closer to the Presidio of Los Adaes.  The mission remained open until 1773.

Mission San Antonio de Valero

Mission San Antonio de Valero was established on May 1, 1718, as the first Spanish mission along the San Antonio River. It was named for San Antonio de Padua, the patron saint of the mission's founder, Father Antonio de Olivares as well as for the viceroy of New Spain, the Marquis de Valero. The mission later became known as the Alamo.

Its first location was west of San Pedro Springs, and after being moved several times, it was finally established above a bend in the San Antonio River, where it would be easy to defend.  The early mission buildings were made of grass, and the first stone building was built in 1727.  The building now known as the Alamo was not built until 1744, and most of its actual structure does not remain. The mission eventually grew to include a granary, workhouse, and rooms for the priests, native peoples, and soldiers. To protect from frequent Apache raids, a wall surrounded the buildings.  Outside the wall were farmlands and ranches owned by the mission.

The mission served the Coahuiltecan Native Americans until 1793, when mission activities ended.  At that time the land and livestock were divided among the thirty-nine Indians remaining at the mission. The buildings later served as a home for a Mexican army unit before becoming a military hospital in 1806. During the Texas Revolution, the buildings served as the site of the Battle of the Alamo, and during the Mexican–American War supplies for the U.S. Army were stored there.  The buildings are now owned by the state of Texas and operated as memorial by the Daughters of the Republic of Texas.

Mission San José y San Miguel de Aguayo

 Shortly after its founding, Mission San Antonio de Valero became overcrowded with refugees from the closed East Texas missions, and Father Antonio Margil received permission from the governor of Coahuila and Texas, the Marquis de San Miguel de Aguayo, to build a new mission. Like San Antonio de Valero, Mission San José served the Coahuiltecan natives. The first buildings, made of brush, straw, and mud, were quickly replaced by large stone structures, including guest rooms, offices, a dining room, and a pantry. A heavy outer wall was built around the main part of the mission, and rooms for 350 Indians were built into the walls.

A new church, which still stands, was constructed in 1768 from local limestone.  The mission lands were given to its Indians in 1794, and mission activities officially ended in 1824.  After that, the buildings were home to soldiers, the homeless, and bandits.  It was restored in the 1930s and is now a state and national historic site.

Mission Nuestra Señora del Espíritu Santo de Zúñiga

Established in 1722 Matagorda Bay (whence the name "La Bahia" The Bay) among the Karankawa Indians
Moved in 1726 near Victoria
Moved in 1749 to La Bahia (now Goliad, Texas)
The mission became the first large cattle ranch in Texas, with near 40,000 free roaming cattle at the height of production in about 1778. The large herds of longhorns and mustangs were cared for by the vaquero Indians from the mission. They also grew large crops of grain, fruit and vegetables to support the residents and trade with others. Cattle and livestock were also driven and traded with the other missions in Texas and Louisiana.
Final official secularization in February 1830
Restored from ruins by the Civilian Conservation Corps and Works Progress Administration in the 1930s
Currently a state historical park operated by the State of Texas Parks and Wildlife Department

Mission San Francisco Xavier de Nájera
Mission San Francisco Xavier de Nájera was established in 1722 in San Antonio, as a result of a promise made by the Marquis de San Miguel de Aguayo, the governor of Spanish Texas. The previous year, Aguayo had asked the El Cuilón (also known as Juan Rodriguez) the chief of the Ervipiame and influential among many of the other tribes of Rancheria Grande natives, such as the Yojuanes and the Mayeye to guide him to East Texas to reopen the missions there; in return, Aguayo promised to open a mission along the San Antonio River for the chief's tribe. The families did not stay long, and by 1726 the mission closed. Its lands were later given to Mission Nuestra Señora de la Purísima Concepción de Acuña.

Mission Santa Cruz de San Sabá

 Established 1757 by the Franciscan Missionaries.
 They lived among the Lipan Apache people.
 Was the first place that the Spanish and the Comanche went into a conflict.
 Destroyed by 2,000 Comanche warriors and their allies in March, 1758.
 Even though the mission was gone the neighboring Presidio San Luis de las Amarillas was still running until 1772.

Mission Nuestra Señora del Rosario

Established 1754 4 miles west of La Bahia to serve various Karankawan tribes.
The mission developed a vast ranching system during its existence.
In 1781 the livestock were transferred to Mission Nuestra Señora del Espíritu Santo de Zúñiga.
Rosario was formally combined with Mission Nuestra Señora del Refugio on February 7, 1807.
Rosario was not secularized until 1828, with the order officially executed in 1831.
Currently the ruins are an archaeological site designated as Mission Rosario State Historic Site and controlled by the State of Texas Parks and Wildlife Department as part of Goliad State Park and Historic Site.

Mission San Francisco Xavier de los Dolores
 Established in 1755 by Pedro de Rábago y Terán established the mission
 Located on the San Marcos River headwaters in Hays County
 The Apache people gathered at this site
 Assets transferred to Mission Santa Cruz de San Sabá in 1756

Mission Nuestra Señora de la Luz
Established 1756
Located near the mouth of the Trinity River north of Wallisville in Chambers County
Destroyed by the Karankawa natives and relocated farther North. Sickness and Indian attacks forced the mission to relocate farther north, on the Trinity River 40 miles south of Dallas.
 This mission then thrived in the cattle and agriculture business. It was the 27th mission in Texas. Spain declined in influence in Texas and Mexico took over this mission. The Mexican Roman Catholic diocese of Guanajuato, Mexico took over the mission operations in Texas with a few exceptions. The Mission was isolated from Mexico and began to do trade with the many different groups of Indians, French and Americans. The Fathers of this mission gave the name "River of the Most Holy Trinity" or "Río de la Santísma Trinidad" to the Trinity river.

Mission Nuestra Señora del Refugio
Established February 4, 1793, in East Texas
Moved in June, 1794 Mosquitos Creek
Moved in January, 1795 to Refugio
On January 7, 1830, the official secularization order was finally executed and Refugio was abandoned.
Materials from ruins probably used to build new structures in the early 19th century. The site is presently owned by Our Lady of Refuge Catholic Church.

Outside boundaries of Spanish Texas

Mission Corpus Christi de la Ysleta 

Founded in 1682
The Tigua tribe  gathered at this site
Located in El Paso
Flooding destroyed the mission twice: once around 1742 and again around 1829.
Present church was constructed in 1851 on higher ground
In 1881, the Jesuits took control and renamed it Mission de Nuestra Señora del Monte Carmelo
In 1980, the name was changed to Mission San Antonio de los Tiguas
Still in use as a church today

Mission San Antonio de Senecú

Established 1682 1¼ miles from Ysleta. Settled by Piro people from New Mexico.
River moved and now in Ciudad Juárez, Mexico.

Mission Nuestra Señora de la Limpia Concepción de Los Piros de Socorro del Sur

Established 1682
The Piros people gathered at this site
Located near Socorro
First permanent mission, built in 1691, was swept away by flood in 1744
Second church was washed away in 1829
Present mission was completed in 1843
Socorro became part of Texas in 1848

Mission San Juan Bautista
Established in 1700-1702
Site now in Guerrero, Coahuila, Mexico.
Coahuiltecan Indians (Ocán, Pacuache, and Pacal) gathered at this site
3rd mission of the San Juan Bautista missions
Also site of a Presidio

Mission Santa María de las Caldas
Established in 1730
The Suma people gathered at this site
Located at Socorro
Closed in 1749

Mission San Francisco Xavier de Horcasitas
Established in 1745
Founded by the College of Santa Cruz de Querétaro
Yojuane, Mayeye, Ervipiame, Hasinia, Top, and Nabedache gathered at this site
Located 5 mi.from Rockdale in Milam County
First of 3 San Xavier missions
A presidio (Spanish military outpost) est. here in 1751
Abandoned in 1755

Mission San Ildefonso
Established in 1746 near the mouth of Brushy Creek
Founded by the College of Santa Cruz de Querétaro
Located 5 mi.from Rockdale in Milam County
Akokisa (Orocquisa), Bidai, and Deadose Indians gathered at this site
Second of 3 San Xavier missions
Abandoned in 1755

Mission Nuestra Señora de la Candelaria del Cañón

 Established circa 1749 on the south bank of the San Gabriel River
 Founded by the College of Santa Cruz de Querétaro
 Located 5 mi.from Rockdale in Milam County
 The Coco Indians and their allies (Tops and Karankawas) gathered at this site
 Third of three San Xavier (Gabriel) missions

Mission San Lorenzo de la Santa Cruz
 Founded 1762 among the Franciscan Missionaries for the Lipan Apaches.
 The first governor of the Lipan Apache here was El Gran Cabezon.
 Located in current Real County
 Abandoned in 1769

Footnotes

See also
On Spanish Missions in neighboring regions:
 Spanish missions in Chihuahua and Coahuila
 Spanish missions in New Mexico
 Spanish missions in Louisiana

On general missionary history:
 Catholic Church and the Age of Discovery
 List of the oldest churches in Mexico

On colonial Spanish American history:
 Spanish Texas
 Spanish colonization of the Americas
 California mission clash of cultures

References

External links
 The Alamo
 Mission Espada
 Mission San Juan
 Mission Concepción
 Mission San José
 Mission Espiritu Santo
 Mission Rosario
 Mission Refugio
 Short Biographies of Early Franciscans in New Mexico & Texas
 Images of Texas Missions from the Portal to Texas History
 The Handbook of Texas Online
 The Five Spanish Missions of Old San Antonio
 Map of Mission, Presidio, and Village locations in Texas 

 
+
New Spain
Colonial Mexico
Colonial United States (Spanish)
Archaeological sites in Texas
History of Catholicism in the United States
18th century in Texas
18th century in Mexico
18th century in New Spain